Bill Malley (born May 27, 1952) is an American professional golfer.

Malley was born in Oakland, California. As an amateur player, he won the U.S. Amateur Public Links and NCGA Public Links Championship in 1984.

Malley played on the European Tour from 1985 to 1994. He had eight top-ten finishes, including second place at the 1987 Jersey Open and the 1990 Wang Four Stars. He also played on the European Seniors Tour in 2006 and 2007.

Malley played on the Nike Tour in 1995 where his best finish was T-8 at the Nike Boise Open.

Playoff record
European Tour playoff record (0–1)

References

External links

American male golfers
European Tour golfers
PGA Tour golfers
European Senior Tour golfers
Golfers from California
Sportspeople from Oakland, California
1952 births
Living people